Pityrodia hemigenioides is a flowering plant in the mint family Lamiaceae and is endemic to the south-west of Western Australia. It is a spreading shrub with densely hairy branches and leaves, and pale white flowers near the ends of the branches.

Description
Older leaves are glabrous with prominent network veins on the lower surface and the edges of the leaves are usually rolled under.

The flowers are arranged singly in upper leaf axils, crowded together so that they seem to form a spike of flowers. The sepals are covered with hairs similar to those on the leaves, except that the inside of the tube is glabrous. The petal tube has a few soft hairs on the outside at first, but is glabrous inside apart from a densely hairy ring above the ovary and a few hairs on the largest petal lobe.

Taxonomy and naming
This species was first formally described in 1868 by Ferdinand von Mueller who gave it the name Chloanthes hemigenioides and published the description in Fragmenta phytographiae Australiae. In 1870, George Bentham changed the name to Pityrodia hemigenioides. The specific epithet (hemigenioides) refers to a perceived similarity to plants in the genus Hemigenia - the suffix -oides means "likeness" in Latin.

Distribution and habitat
This pityrodia grows in yellow sand on sandplains and dunes, mainly in near-coastal areas between Geraldton and Shark Bay in the Avon Wheatbelt, Geraldton Sandplains and Yalgoo biogeographic regions.

Conservation
Pityrodia hemigenioides is classified as "not threatened" by the Government of Western Australia Department of Parks and Wildlife.

References

hemigenioides
Plants described in 1868
Flora of Western Australia
Taxa named by Ferdinand von Mueller